Albert Franz Josef Karl Friedrich Georg Hubert Maria, Archduke of Austria, Prince Royal of Hungary and Bohemia, Duke of Teschen (In German: Erzherzog Albrecht Franz Josef Karl Friedrich Georg Hubert Maria von Österreich, Herzog von Teschen) – (24 July 1897 – 23 July 1955) was a member of the House of Habsburg and titular pretender to the Duchy of Teschen.

Early life
Archduke Albrecht Franz was born in Vienna, Austria-Hungary, only son of Archduke Friedrich, Duke of Teschen (1856–1936, son of Archduke Karl Ferdinand of Austria and Archduchess Elisabeth Franziska of Austria) and his wife, Princess Isabella of Croÿ (1856–1931, daughter of Rudolf, Duke of Croÿ and Princess Natalie of Ligne). He had eight elder sisters and was the youngest child of the family.

Marriages
On 16 August 1930 Albrecht Franz married morganatically in Brighton, England, Irene Dora Lelbach (1897–1985), daughter of Johann Lelbach and Ilma Skultéty de Alsólehota. They had no issue. They divorced on 1 June 1937.

His second marriage was to Katalin Bocskay de Felsö-Bánya (1909–2000), on 7 May 1938. They had two daughters, named below. Following the rules of morganatic marriages, the daughters did not inherit the title of their father, in this case that of Archduchess; however, Otto von Habsburg granted them the title of Gräfin von Habsburg ("Countess of Habsburg") in addition to their legal titles at birth of "magyar királyi hercegnő" ("Royal Princess of Hungary") Albrecht and Katalin divorced in 1951.

Charlotte Izabella Mária Krisztine Eszter Katalin Pia, Countess von Habsburg, Princess of Hungary (3 March 1940 – 2 November 2020) she married Ferdinand Wutholen (9 February 1927–2018) on 20 July 1967. They have four children. 
Ildiko Katalin Izabella Henriette Alice Mária, Countess von Habsburg, Princess of Hungary (19 February 1942) she married Joseph Calleja on 23 February 1963 and they were divorced in February 1978. They have four children. She remarried Terrance D. Fortier on 2 February 1982 and had one son. 

His third marriage was to Lydia Strauss-Dorner, daughter of Karl Hans Beltram "Bela" Strauss-Dorner and Minka "Mici" or "Mitzy" Ellen Clarissa Schey von Koromla.
Their son was Rudolf Stefan von Habsburg (14 April 1951 Asuncion, Paraguay - 4 July 1992 San Carlos de Bariloce,Bariloce,Rio Negro,Argentina)

Ancestry

References

Bibliography
 Heiszler, Vilmos. Photo Habsburg: Frederick Habsburg and his Family. Budapest: Corvina, 1989.
 Palmer, Alan. Twilight of the Habsburgs: The Life and Times of Emperor Francis Joseph. Atlantic Monthly Press; 1st Pbk. Ed edition.

External links
 http://gazetacodzienna.pl/artykul/wydarzenia/ostatni-ksiaze-cieszynski-mieszkal-w-ameryce-poudniowej

1897 births
1955 deaths
Dukes of Teschen
House of Habsburg-Lorraine
Knights of the Golden Fleece of Austria
Austrian princes